Karin Jørgensen née Rasmussen is a Danish former badminton player. She won nine National Danish titles and five Nordic titles in addition to playing for the national team 28 times from 1961 to 1972. However, she is best known for her All England title successes with her sister Ulla Strand née Rasmussen. The pair won the doubles in 1964 and 1965.

Record at the All England

References

Danish female badminton players
Possibly living people